The 1912–13 Massachusetts Agricultural College Aggies men's ice hockey season was the 5th season of play for the program.

Season
Building upon the recent success of the young program, the Aggies scheduled three games against the upper echelon teams. Mass Ag lost all three games but in their other three matches the Aggies proved they were still among the best of the rest.

Roster

Standings

Schedule and Results

|-
!colspan=12 style=";" | Regular Season

References

UMass Minutemen ice hockey seasons
Massachusetts Agricultural College
Massachusetts Agricultural College
Massachusetts Agricultural College
Massachusetts Agricultural College